Westbourne School is a coeducational independent day and boarding school, nursery and prep school for pupils between the ages of 2 and 18 located in the commuter town of Penarth, in the Vale of Glamorgan, Wales 5.2 miles (8.4 kilometres) south west from the Welsh capital city of Cardiff.

Traditionally the school was strictly boys only. However, in the mid 1980s, the decision was taken to also accept girls and become a coeducational school. Westbourne School opened its 6th form for the Autumn term of 2008.  The school introduced the speciality of the Diploma Programme of the International Baccalaureate Organisation in 2008.

The school is housed within two buildings, approximately half a mile apart. The first houses the Nursery and Prep, the other the senior school and sixth form. Class sizes remain small, varying from a maximum of 20 in the senior school down to as low as 8 in some subjects. The academic results are consistently excellent and Westbourne School is nationally recognised as a high achieving school, named No.1 in Wales and IB School of the Year 2019 by the Sunday Times Schools Guide. 
Westbourne School achieved the highest grading of excellent across all categories in its 2018 Estyn Inspection. The school is now owned by the Montague Place Group of Independent Schools.

History

Foundation
The school first opened in 1895 at Ebenezer House on Westbourne Road, Penarth. However the school's foundation is deemed to be during the following year in 1896 under the headship of Mrs Caroline Ferris. Mrs Ferris renamed Ebenezer House as Westbourne House and the school was therefore retitled  as Westbourne House Preparatory School for Boys.

In 1901 the school relocated to the large corner property at 13 Stanwell Road, which still forms part of the current school building.

Expansion
In 1975 the adjoining property at 4 Hickman Road was also purchased and the combined properties were developed as Westbourne Senior School. The school opened a junior college for children aged between 9 and 11 years of age.
It was decided to make the additional purchase of the struggling independent St Alma’s Girls School located in Victoria Road and, with the purchase, the combined school became coeducational.

The school today

Organisation
The Victoria Road facility houses the Nursery and Prep School. The Senior School and Sixth Form are located in the main school building on the corner of Stanwell and Hickman roads.

Westbourne School also benefits from occasional visiting teachers and tutors from local Cardiff schools, colleges and universities. School facilities include gymnasium, IT suite, library, science laboratories, sports hall as well as access to local sports facilities including athletics track, Penarth RFC rugby pitch and the International Sports Village in Cardiff Bay.

Sixth form
The Autumn term 2008 saw the establishment of the school’s first sixth form, housed in a new Research and Media Centre with its separate sixth form common room and roof terrace, ICT and Computing Department.

The school offers the Diploma Programme of The International Baccalaureate Organisation.

The school has ranked Number 1 in the UK for its results, small school league tables, Daily Telegraph, Best-Schools, 2018, 2017, 2016, 2015.

Westbourne was named IB School of the Year 2019 by the Sunday Times School Guide.

Inspection
The school was last inspected in 2018 and was awarded the grade of Excellent in every inspection category by  ‘’’Estyn’’’

Results
In 2018 40% of pupils achieved A*, 20% of which, at the new higher grade 9, the school out-performed the national average by 5 times. 55-60% of pupils consistently achieve grade A*-A at GCSE/IGCSE. 
Results at Sixth Form consistently secure Westbourne as the top small IB school in the UK. In 2018, more than half of students achieved 38+ points and 2/3rds of IB students achieved a fully bi-lingual IB Diploma.

Notable alumni
 Adrian Goldsworthy (born 1969) - is a British historian and military writer.

References

Private schools in the Vale of Glamorgan
Educational institutions established in 1896
1896 establishments in Wales
International Baccalaureate schools in Wales
Penarth